Anneliese Bauer is a East German retired slalom canoeist who competed from the late 1950s to the mid-1960s. She won three medals at the ICF Canoe Slalom World Championships with a gold (Folding K-1 team: 1963) and two silvers (Folding K-1: 1959, 1961).

References
ICF medalists for Olympic and World Championships - Part 2: rest of flatwater (now sprint) and remaining canoeing disciplines: 1936-2007.

East German female canoeists
Possibly living people
Year of birth missing (living people)
Medalists at the ICF Canoe Slalom World Championships